"Bernadette" is a 1967 hit song recorded by the Four Tops for the Motown label. The song was written and composed by Holland–Dozier–Holland, Motown's main songwriting team, and produced by Brian Holland and Lamont Dozier.

Billboard described the song as a "hard-driving rocker" with an "outstanding performance by the group."  Cash Box called the single a "pulsating Detroit lid underscored by that steady, danceable rhythm."  The song reached #4 on the Billboard Hot 100, and was The Four Tops's final Top 10 hit of the 1960s. On the soul chart, "Bernadette" went to number three.  It also reached #8 in the UK on its first release and was a hit again in 1972, reaching #23.

The song is notable for its false ending, where the instruments drop out and the background singers hold a chord. Lead singer Levi Stubbs then shouts "Bernadette!" and the song resumes, ending in a fade-out.  Critic Maury Dean described the effectiveness of Stubb's shout of "Bernadette!" as being the key ingredient in getting listeners to buy the record, even if Bernadette herself may not have heard him.

AllMusic critic John Bush calls it "dramatic" and "impassioned."

Personnel
 Lead vocals by Levi Stubbs
 Background vocals by Abdul "Duke" Fakir, Renaldo "Obie" Benson, Lawrence Payton, and The Andantes: Jackie Hicks, Marlene Barrow, and Louvain Demps
 Instrumentation by The Funk Brothers
 Written and composed by Brian Holland, Lamont Dozier, and Edward Holland, Jr.
 Produced by Brian Holland and Lamont Dozier

Notes and references

External links
 List of cover versions of "Bernadette" at SecondHandSongs.com

1967 singles
Four Tops songs
Songs written by Holland–Dozier–Holland
Motown singles
1967 songs
1966 songs
Song recordings produced by Brian Holland
Song recordings produced by Lamont Dozier
Songs about jealousy